Guy Forget defeated Pete Sampras in the final, 7–6(11–9), 4–6, 5–7, 6–4, 6–4 to win the singles tennis title at the 1991 Paris Open. Forget became the first French champion of the Paris Open.

Stefan Edberg was the defending champion, but lost in the third round to Michael Chang.

Seeds

Draw

Finals

Top half

Section 1

Section 2

Bottom half

Section 3

Section 4

External links
 ATP main draw

1991 ATP Tour
1991 Paris Open